The 2014 European Parliament election in Malta elected Malta's delegation to the European Parliament from 2014 to 2019. This was the third such election held in Malta. The elections were held on Saturday, 24 May 2014.

The parties that contested the election were:
Labour Party,
Nationalist Party,
Democratic Alternative,
Imperium Europa,
Alleanza Bidla,
Alleanza Liberali,
Partit Ta' L-Ajkla.

Candidates

Imperium Europa

Arlette Baldacchino
Antoine Galea
Norman Lowell

Partit Laburista

Lino Bianco
Clint Camilleri
Peter Cordina
Joseph Cuschieri
Miriam Dalli
Mario Borg Farrugia
Charlon Gouder
Ivan Grixti
Marlene Mizzi
Alfred Sant
Deborah Schembri
Fleur-Anne Vella

Partit Ta' L-Ajkla 

Nazzareno Bonnici

Partit Nazzjonalista

Raymond Bugeja
David Casa
Therese Comodini Cachia
Kevin Cutajar
Helga Ellul
Stefano Mallia
Roberta Metsola
Kevin Plumpton
Jonathan Shaw
Norman Vella
Francis Zammit Dimech

Alternattiva Demokratika

Carmel Cacopardo
Arnold Cassola

Alleanza Bidla

Anthony Calleja
Ivan Grech Mintoff

Alleanza Liberali 

Jean-Pierre Sammut

Results
The Labour Party won the election with a little over 53% of the votes. The result was announced by the Maltese Prime Minister, Joseph Muscat.

The Nationalist Party won 40%, Democratic Alternative 2.9%, Imperium Europa 2.8% and others 0.96%.

Despite receiving just 40% of the electors vote, the Nationalist Party won its third seat, previously held by the Labour Party. Therefore, the elected candidates are:  
1. Alfred Sant (PL) (48739 votes)  
2. Roberta Metsola (PN) (38442 votes) 
3. Miriam Dalli (PL) (37533 votes) 
4. David Casa (PN) (36371 votes) 
5. Marlene Mizzi (PL) (35630 votes) 
6. Therese Comodini Cachia (PN) (29580 votes).

See also 
2014 European Parliament election
 European elections in Malta
 2009 European Parliament election in Malta
 2004 European Parliament election in Malta

References 

Malta
European Parliament elections in Malta
2014 in Malta